All India Jute Textile Workers' Federation, a trade union of jute mill workers in India. The union is affiliated to the Hind Mazdoor Sabha.

Trade unions in India
Trade unions of the West Bengal jute mills
Hind Mazdoor Sabha-affiliated unions
Jute industry of India
Jute industry trade unions
Organizations with year of establishment missing